"Diamond/Over the Clouds" is a double A-side released by Chinese singer Alan. It was released in three different versions: a CD+DVD edition, a CD only edition, and a limited CD only edition. The ringtone is distributed since Jan 12, 2010, and CD is released from avex trax at Feb 3, 2010.

"Diamond" was used as the ending theme song for the NTV anime Inuyasha Kanketsuhen, while "Over the clouds" was used as the opening theme song for the PSP game God Eater.

Track listing

CD 
 Diamond
 Lyricist: Seiko Fujibayashi, Composer: Kazuhito Kikuchi, Arranger: ats-
 Over the clouds
 Lyricist: Narumi Yamamoto, Composer: Kazuhito Kikuchi, Arranger: Yuta Nakano
 Diamond (Instrumental)
 Over the clouds (Instrumental)

CD (Limited Edition)
 Over the clouds
 Diamond
 Over the clouds (Instrumental)
 Diamond (Instrumental)

DVD 
 Diamond (Music Video) (directed by: Wataru Takeishi)
 "InuYasha Kanketsuhen" ED Animation Video
 PSP Game "GOD EATER" OP Animation Video

Certifications

References

2010 singles
Alan Dawa Dolma songs
2010 songs
Songs with music by Kazuhito Kikuchi
Avex Trax singles